A resulting trust is an implied trust that comes into existence by operation of law, where property is transferred to someone who pays nothing for it; and then is implied to have held the property for benefit of another person. The trust property is said to  "result" or jump back to the transferor (implied settlor). In this instance, the word 'result' means "in the result, remains with", or something similar to "revert" except that in the result the beneficial interest is held on trust for the settlor. Not all trusts whose beneficiary is also the settlor can be called resulting trusts. In common law systems, the resulting trust refers to a subset of trusts which have such outcome; express trusts which stipulate that the settlor is to be the beneficiary are not normally considered resulting trusts. Another understanding of resulting trusts could be an equitable instrument used to rectify and reverse unjust enrichment.

The beneficial interest results in the settlor, or if the settlor has died the property forms part of the settlor's estate (intestacy). It remains with the person and the case of "Vandervell v Inland Reveneue Commissioners" [1967]  shows that only the beneficial interest disappears but not the beneficiary interest.

Closely-related parties

Some jurisdictions may establish a rebuttable presumption of gift for property transfers between relatives. The presumption may operate as an affirmative defense to a petition to establish a resulting trust implied by operation of law as it is.

The law presumes that it is legitimate to transfer property to a family member, particularly for a relative's support. But an unrelated transferee who receives substantial value without consideration is ordinarily presumed to hold the property in trust for benefit of the transferor, unless it can be proven by them that it was intended to be a gift. The rebuttable presumption of gift affects transfers between siblings, uncles, aunts, children, and grandchildren.

A notable exception to the presumption of gift is the transfer of property between husband and wife (transmutations). The marital exception to presumption of gift arises from the fiduciary duty that spouses owe to one another. Spouses have a special trusted relationship that imputes an obligation of utmost good faith and fair dealing. Accordingly, spouses are deemed incapable of transmutation except under specified circumstances, such as when making an EXPRESS DECLARATION of transmutation as by clear statement in a deed or other writing of substantial dignity.

Unlawful purpose
In common law jurisdictions, a resulting trust law is a creation of the law of equity, rather than of common law (in the strict sense). Accordingly, the laws of some jurisdictions might recognize equitable defenses such as laches, unclean hands, and the responsibility to do equity. For example, if a transferor transfers property for an unlawful purpose and gains a benefit, then a court might hold that he has waived his right to claim a resulting trust. In such situations, a court balances the transferee's unjust enrichment with the enablement of cheating by the transferor. Enabling a cheater to gain from his transaction would erode the legitimacy of the court.

Other jurisdictions may elect to disregard an unlawful purpose.

In situations involving illegality, it can become difficult to distinguish implementation of a resulting trust theory (implied by operation of law) from an oral express trust (one implied by the facts). A transferor failing upon one theory might still prevail upon the other.

Resulting trusts in English law

Classification 
One attempt to classify resulting trusts was made by Megarry J in Re Vandervell's Trusts (no.2)[1974] Ch 269. According to Megarry J there are two sorts of resulting trusts in English law.

Presumptive resulting trusts 
These are transfers made by A to B, where the law creates a rebuttable presumption of a resulting trust applying if the intention is not made clear by A. (written evidence produced).

For example, when A transfers property to B, unless the transfer was made by father to child or by husband to wife, in the absence of any other evidence the law presumes that a resulting trust has been created for A.(Y this category excluded: i.e.:A evidence cannot stand in Course of testimony & remains Hearsay)(A will not get the property if H&W/F&C can adduce evidence it is their property and resulting trust will not arise.

The main categories of fact situations giving rise to a presumption of a resulting trust are:
- Where A makes a voluntary conveyance of property to B 
- Where A has made a monetary contribution to the purchase of property for B ( The Venture, [1908] P 218,(1907) 77 L.J.P. 105.)

From these cases it can be stated that where there is a voluntary transfer of property, the law presumes the recipient holds that property on resulting trust, until the property is transferred back to the original owner, unless the recipient can show a gift was intended.

The presumptions are, however, easily rebutted. In Fowkes v Pascoe, evidence was shown that a woman had purchased stock in the names of herself and her grandson; evidence by the grandson and granddaughter-in-law that this had been done as a gift was admissible. On the other hand, the presumption is solely concerned with evidence of an intent to create a trust; ulterior motives to create a trust are not taken into account. In Tinsley v Milligan, a woman transferred property to her business partner on trust in order to fraudulently claim social security payments; it was held that this did not defeat the presumption of a resulting trust.

The fact that is being proved by the presumption of a resulting trust is the intention to create a trust for the settlor. This view of presumed resulting trusts has been endorsed by Lord Browne-Wilkinson in Westdeutsche Landesbank Girozentrale v Islington LBC [1996] AC 669);

"...the presumption of resulting trust is rebutted by evidence of any intention inconsistent with such a trust, not only by evidence of an intention to make a gift."

Some have argued that this presumption arises as a result of a lack of intention to transfer any beneficial interest,. This view has generally not received judicial endorsement.(obiter dicta)

Voluntary transfer of land 
Despite the general onus of resulting trust where it is very much on the recipient to show there is intention of a gift, this presumption does not apply in the case of voluntary transfers of land. This is owing to the Law of Property Act 1925 s.60(3), which states:

(3) In a voluntary conveyance a resulting trust for the grantor shall not be implied merely by reason that the property is not expressed to be conveyed for the use or benefit of the grantee.

Despite that, it was explained in Ali v Khan [2002] EWCA Civ 974 that although LPA abolished the presumption of a resulting trust from the act of the transfer of land alone, it remained open to a court to consider extrinsic evidence to establish that a trust did in fact arise.

Automatic resulting trusts 
In these trusts " there is no mention of any expression of intention in any instrument, or of any presumption of a resulting trust: the resulting trust takes effect by operation of law,(by law:implied that property will revert to you) and so appears to be automatic." ( per Megarry J, Re Vandervell's Trusts (No 2)) [1974]

Automatic resulting trusts can arise when the settlor tries to set up a trust for a third party, but there is an initial failure for want of objects; for example, by naming beneficiaries which cannot be defined, as in Morice v Bishop of Durham, or when the objectives of the trust no longer become possible or relevant by the time of the transfer to the trustee, as in Re Gillingham Bus Disaster Fund [1958] Ch 300.

Some academics commentators suggested that the automatic resulting trust will arise 'only where the property has been transferred to a trustee on an express trust so that the trustee has legal title to the property that can then be held on trust for the settlor'. However, it is uncertain whether this category of resulting trust can be explained by the presumption of an intention to declare a trust. The rationale for the recognition of the automatic resulting trusts where an express trust has failed remains controversial, Quistclose trust in particular. (Twinsectra v yardley [2002] )

Settlor's intention in automatic resulting trusts 
In relation to automatic resulting trusts, there is some difference in expressing the nature of the settlor's intention:
 In Westdeutsche Lord Browne-Wilkinson stated that a resulting trust arises due to a legal "presumed intention to create a trust in favour of the settlor"
 It has also been suggested that it is the fact of a "lack of intention to benefit the recipient" that creates the trust. This could be referred to as the Chambers Model of intention.The settlor intends to retain the beneficial interest in the property, but transfers the legal title to someone else (for example, to let an active child manage the assets). The trust is implied by the settlor's lack of intention to transfer any beneficial interest

Although in most cases the outcome would be the same, it is highly significant to differentiate between a positive intention to retain beneficial interest, and a lack of intention to benefit the transferee.. It is often difficult to prove intention, but easier to prove the circumstances when a legal presumption will arise.  It may be more or less easy to rebut a presumption than to disprove an intention.

Lord Browne-Wilkinson was afraid that this would create a "floodgates" problem, by giving every claimant a proprietary right in bankruptcy - making many more claimants secured creditors, and thus making the position of a secured creditor much less valuable. It is imperative to prove intention because equity will not assist a volunteer and is suspicious of gifts. Except under certain circumstances such as a parent and child or spouse.

Resulting trusts in South Africa 
In South Africa there is no doctrine of resulting trusts, and the main remedy, if any of the trust purposes should fail, would be as an unjust enrichment, per Westdeutsche Landesbank v Council of London Borough of Islington.

See also
 Pettitt v Pettitt [1970] AC 777

References

Wills and trusts
Equity (law)